Junior Lefevre (born October 17, 1978, in Etterbeek, Belgium) is a Belgian-Croatian karateka. He has a  6th Dan black belt in karate and is the winner of multiple World Karate Championships and European Karate Championships medals, representing both Croatia and Belgium at tournaments. He is also chairman of C.I.K.A world (champions international karate association).

Achievements

Belgium
 1996  World Karate Championships Kumite  Bronze Medal
 1998  World Karate Championships Kumite  Bronze Medal

Croatia

 2000  World Karate Championships Kumite -70 kg Gold Medal
 2001  European Karate Championships Kumite -70 kg  Bronze Medal
 2002  World Karate Championships Kumite -70 kg  Silver Medal
 2003  European Karate Championships Kumite -70 kg  Bronze Medal
 2003  European Karate Championships Kumite Open  Bronze Medal

References

1978 births
People from Etterbeek
Living people
Croatian male karateka
Shotokan practitioners
Karate coaches
Croatian people of Belgian descent
Belgian male karateka
Naturalized citizens of Croatia
Sportspeople from Brussels